Mabbly is a digital branding agency based in Chicago. It was founded by Adam Fridman and operates under CEO Hank Ostholthoff. In 2015, Will Schmidt of Tech.co wrote, "Adam Fridman is one of nine entrepreneurs who are improving the way of life in Chicago."

Mabbly has created a media hub inspired by their founder's INC interview with Simon Sinek. Science of Story is a movement to discover and share purpose transformation, from culture to communicating digitally. This movement focuses on developing a purpose for companies as a whole.

References

Companies based in Chicago